Stacy Adams may refer to:

 Stacy Adams Shoe Company, a brand of menswear
 Stacy Adams (American football) (born 1966), head football coach at Valparaiso University